The Deutsche Bahn AG in Germany reserves classes 088, 188 and 288 for all historical motive power (locomotives, multiple-units, railcars and railbuses) that are no longer part of their active, commercial fleet, but are still in their inventory.  These classes are however, generally, 'virtual' because whilst they are used in the computerised database for management purposes, the running numbers are usually only recorded in the cab of the actual vehicle. Externally the original vehicle numbers are displayed.

These group classes have the following definitions:
 Class 088: historic steam locomotives
 Class 188: historic electric locomotives
 Class 288: historic diesel locomotives
 Class 488: historic electric railcars
 Class 688: historic diesel railcars

See also
List of preserved steam locomotives in Germany
List of DBAG locomotives and railbuses

External links
 There is an English-language discussion forum at Railways of Germany

088